Carl Ferdinand Langhans (14 January 1782 – 22 November 1869) was a Prussian architect whose specialty was designing theaters.

Born in Breslau (Wrocław), Silesia, Langhans was the son of the architect Carl Gotthard Langhans.

Langhans' designs included opera houses in Berlin and Leipzig, theaters in Breslau and Liegnitz, and the Berlin palace (Altes Palais) of Kaiser Wilhelm I. He is also remembered for his innovative pleorama entertainment.

Langhans died in Berlin. His grave is preserved in the Protestant Friedhof III der Jerusalems- und Neuen Kirchengemeinde (Cemetery No. III of the congregations of Jerusalem's Church and New Church) in Berlin-Kreuzberg, south of Hallesches Tor.

References
Artcyclopedia links for Langhans

1782 births
1869 deaths
19th-century German architects
Architects from Wrocław
People from the Province of Silesia
Theatre architects